Maharaja Umaid Singh Stadium, formerly known as the Umaid Sports Stadium, is a multipurpose stadium situated in the Paota suburb of Jodhpur, Rajasthan.The sports complex is built in 1932 headed by Maharaja of Jodhpur Umaid Singh as a sports ground.  It is mostly used for political rallies, cultural activities and sporting events.

History 
Maharaja Umaid Singh Stadium was built by that time Maharaja Umaid Singh in 1932 as a sports ground. It is the oldest stadium in the city of Jodhpur.

Rajasthan Government announced 2 crore budget to renovate the stadium and make a shooting range. Currently a state level association football academy is running the stadium.

A football club from Jaipur, AU Rajasthan FC borrowed the stadium for their I-League 2nd division matches.
Now it is owned by Govt of Rajasthan which uses it for various purposes.

References 

Stadiums
Buildings and structures completed in 1932
Buildings and structures in Jodhpur
AU Rajasthan FC
20th-century architecture in India